

This is a list of the National Register of Historic Places listings in LaSalle Parish, Louisiana.

This is intended to be a complete list of the properties on the National Register of Historic Places in LaSalle Parish, Louisiana, United States. The locations of National Register properties for which the latitude and longitude coordinates are included below, may be seen in a map.

There are 3 properties listed on the National Register in the parish.

Current listings

|}

See also
List of National Historic Landmarks in Louisiana
National Register of Historic Places listings in Louisiana

References

LaSalle Parish